North Pole-1 was the world's first Soviet manned drifting station in the Arctic Ocean, primarily used for research.

The expedition had been airlifted by aviation units under the command of Mark Shevelev. "NP-1" operated for 9 months, during which the ice floe travelled . The commander of the station was Ivan Papanin. On 19 February 1938 the Soviet ice breakers Taimyr and Murman took four polar explorers off the station close to the eastern coast of Greenland. They arrived in Leningrad on 15 March on board the icebreaker Yermak.

The expedition members, hydrobiologist Pyotr Shirshov, geophysicist Yevgeny Fyodorov, radioman Ernst Krenkel, and the commander Ivan Papanin, were awarded the Hero of the Soviet Union title.

References

Exploration of the Arctic
Polar exploration by Russia and the Soviet Union
1937 in the Soviet Union
Arctic research
Arctic expeditions
1937 in science
20th century in the Arctic
Expeditions from the Soviet Union
North Pole